Scam 1992: The Harshad Mehta Story is an Indian Hindi-language biographical financial thriller streaming television series on SonyLIV directed by Hansal Mehta, with Jai Mehta serving as the co-director. Based on the 1992 Indian stock market scam committed by many stockbrokers including Harshad Mehta, the series is adapted from journalist Sucheta Dalal and Debashish Basu's 1992 book The Scam: Who Won, Who Lost, Who Got Away. The screenplay and dialogues were written by Sumit Purohit, Saurabh Dey, Vaibhav Vishal and Karan Vyas.

It stars Pratik Gandhi as the protagonist Harshad Mehta, with Shreya Dhanwanthary appearing in a parallel lead role, as Sucheta Dalal. The series also features Satish Kaushik, Anant Mahadevan, Rajat Kapoor, K K Raina, Lalit Parimoo, Hemant Kher and Nikhil Dwivedi in pivotal roles. The series focuses on Harshad Mehta's life story, his meteoric rise and the subsequent downfall.

Originally produced by Sameer Nair of Applause Entertainment, Hansal Mehta, worked for three years in writing the script consisting of 550 pages. The project was officially announced in December 2019, with principal shoot beginning following its announcement. Filmed across 200 locations in Mumbai, within 85 days, the shooting was wrapped up in March 2020. The cinematography was handled by Pratham Mehta and the series was edited by Sumit Purohit and Kunal Walve. Achint Thakkar composed the background score.

Scam 1992 was premiered on SonyLIV on 9 October 2020. The series eventually received praise from the performances of the cast members, writing and the major technical aspects. It became the most viewed web series on the streaming platform.

In March 2021, SonyLiv and Applause Entertainment announced the second installment of the franchise titled Scam 2003 based on 2003 Stamp Paper Scam. It is to be directed by Hansal Mehta.

Cast

Episodes

Production

Development 

In February 2018, Sameer Nair, CEO of Applause Entertainment, a content studio from the Aditya Birla Group, announced a web series, consisting of 10 episodes, based on the 1992 Indian stock market scam committed by stockbroker Harshad Mehta, which was adapted by journalist Sucheta Dalal and Debashish Basu, as a novel in the same year, titled The Scam: Who Won, Who Lost, Who Got Away. The makers planned to undergo pre-production works for a year, despite the director and cast and crew were not finalized.

In December 2019, filmmaker Hansal Mehta announced that he will be directing the series, which will be titled Scam 1992. Sumit Purohit, Saurav Dey, Vaibhav Vishal, and Karan Vyas were roped in to pen the screenplay and dialogues. Before the announcement of the series, it was reported that Abhishek Bachchan's The Big Bull, is based on the same plot, while Mehta claimed that the film is based on a fictional work, with the outline of the story being used for the film, while the series is based on Dalal's novel.

Casting 
The casting of the series is done by casting director Mukesh Chhabra, which features around 150 characters. Mehta chose Gujarati theatre actor Pratik Gandhi, to play the protagonist Harshad Mehta, while Shreya Dhanwanthary, was cast to play the parallel lead as Sucheta Dalal. Apart from the lead actors, Satish Kaushik, Anant Mahadevan, Rajat Kapoor, Nikhil Dwivedi, K K Raina, and Lalit Parimoo were cast in pivotal roles.

Pratik Gandhi stated that playing the character of Harshad Mehta is an interesting one as "it has many layers of good and bad to it". He further added "The audience will have a great time figuring if the real Harshad Mehta was a hero or a villain". Shreya stated Dalal's character as "a strong, bold and independent woman who broke this story to the world and yet went through mixed emotions through this journey". Gandhi also stated he had to gain weight by 18 kilograms, to fit into the role of Harshad Mehta, whereas the preparations were undergone for more than a year following look tests and script reading.

Filming 
The principal shoot of the film kickstarted in December 2019, soon after the announcement of the series. It was filmed in 200 locations, with major on-location sets were filmed across South Mumbai. The makers recreated huge portions of the sets to resemble the period of 1980s and 1990s. Cinematographer Pratham Mehta, stated that the crew had sought major unused structures in Mumbai to shoot the film.

Mehta's upscale apartment in Worli, was recreated by modifying the exteriors of an existing building at Malvani in Malad West, and the interiors were created inside a bungalow in Madh Island, which were modified to look similar to the actual flat belonging to Harshad Mehta using photographs available online for reference, and some portions were recreated using the help of visual effects. The team also recreated the office headquarters of The Times Group in Mumbai, with a huge set being constructed at the Golden Tobacco Compound in Vile Parle.

Major portions of the film were shot at Bombay Stock Exchange in Mumbai, with the show makers however got permission to shoot for short durations of time. Art director Payal Ghose added, "They were also not allowed to make many changes to the present ring, which has undergone many renovations over the years. Despite this, the team was able to get much of the design right with the help of a consultant who had worked there during that period. The BSE itself also provided a book on its history as a reference point for the production team." The film's shooting which spanned for 89 days, was completed in March 2020, before the COVID-19 pandemic lockdown in India.

Music 
The original score of Scam 1992, was composed by Achint Thakkar. The theme music of the film received a rave response from the listeners, which was followed by the composer who uploaded the theme song through his official YouTube channel. Thakkar worked on the score and soundtrack, during the nationwide lockdown. The theme song consisting of three elements - bass, drums and strings, with an audible and coherent lyrics heard through the theme, is a stretched out, "Hey" being played on loop. He stated "With the tune in mind, I came up with the backbone of the drums, and then played the bass guitar myself. The bass is a very important part of the track and is the main riff which is why it had to be perfect. So it was the three things, with the added vocal which was minimal on top, that made the tune come together as know it in its final version." The song crossed 7 million streams in music streaming platforms upon release and became popular among audiences.

The series also features tracks from the folk band Kabir Café naming 'Do Din Ki Zindagi Hai, Do Din Ka Mela', which is a composition based on the poem of 15th century saint Kabirdas, and a song from their 2016 album 'Panchrang', 'Matkar Maya Ko Ahankar' which is played by the ending scenes of the last episode.

Marketing and release
Scam 1992's digital rights were acquired by SonyLIV, an over-the-top media service platform from Sony Pictures Networks. The teaser of the series was unveiled on 21 August 2020, through the YouTube channel of SonyLIV. The 85-second teaser presents a glimpse of Harshad Mehta's character. The official trailer was unveiled on 25 September 2020, which explores the rise and subsequent downfall of Mehta. The Indian Express stated that "the trailer promises to be an intriguing affair". On 27 September 2020, the makers announced that the series will premiere directly through the streaming platform on 9 October 2020.

The official release through its OTT platform SonyLIV, consists of ten episodes, with being released in Hindi and English languages. Due to the response received by the audiences, and its performance, the makers planned to dub the series in Tamil, Telugu, Malayalam and Kannada languages, in order to have a wide reach towards the audiences. The dubbed versions were made available on 29 November 2020.

Scam 1992's leading actors Pratik Gandhi and Shreya Dhanwanthary played with Free Fire Content Creators Total Gaming and Two Side Gamers on YouTube to promote their Web Series on 21 November 2020 and 22 November 2020 respectively.

Reception

Critical response
The series received mostly positive reviews from critics, with praise for the performances and writing. Sayan Ghosh of The Hindu wrote "Scam 1992: The Harshad Mehta Story is a well-written show with its lead characters doing all the heavy lifting. Despite its flaws, it provides an intriguing sneak-peek at the untapped potential of homegrown content creators — and what they are capable of — if allowed to run wild with their imagination.” Ronak Kotecha, editor-in-chief of The Times of India gave three-and-a-half of five stating "The fact that it’s a real story that captured the country’s collective imagination makes for a riveting watch. It’s almost like our very own desi version of The Wolf of Wall Street and we’re quite bullish that it will keep you invested." Jyoti Sharma Bawa of Hindustan Times said, "Hansal Mehta digs deep into the India of 80s and 90s to tell us the story of the securities scam that shook up the country. Harshad Mehta’s boom-to-bust story is emblematic of its time, but not limited to it." Subhra Gupta of The Indian Express stated "The Hansal Mehta directed series does a smart balancing act, never quite tipping over into Harshad Mehta adulation, nor showing him as an unmitigated villain."

Devasheesh Pandey of News18, gave three-and-a-half out of five stars and stated "Scam 1992: The Harshad Mehta Story does not pronounce guilty verdict on India's first financial sector scamster, but presents us with a morally dubious character and leaves it our sensibilities whether to make him a messiah or a pariah." Tatsam Mukherjee, writing for Firstpost, summarised "In spite of all the research, the show never quite transports us into Harshad's mind — the greed, the compulsive need to be surrounded by materialist things, the arrogance of taking on the government, and the tragedy of a 'pioneer' turned into an outcast." Scroll's chief editor Nandini Ramanath reviewed "Scam 1992 provides ample evidence of Mehta’s dishonesty over 500-plus minutes, only to float the idea that the system was the bigger villain. This bull got big but then ran into the wolves who were stronger, the series lamely suggests."

Moumita Bhattacharya of Rediff gave three-and-a-half out of five and stated "Hansal Mehta's nine-hour drama series Scam 1992 needs to be viewed by everyone, young and old." The News Minute's Saraswati Darar wrote "Scam 1992: The Harshad Mehta Story, it’s a compellingly told labour of love that deserves to be watched." Shefali Deshpande of Bloomberg Quint gave four-and-a-half out of five stating, "Scam 1992 taps into the psychological need to succeed and have prestige." Amman Khurana of Zoom TV, gave four out of five and stated "Scam 1992 – The Harshad Mehta Story, despite being significantly long, never goes off track and keeps you glued till the end. The deft direction, skilfully-stitched screenplay and thorough research do the job." Shubham Kulkarni of Koimoi, gave four out of five and stated "It is one of those rare shows where the primary layer is the only thing to hook on, and the writing does wonders here." Prathyush Parasuraman writing for Film Companion gave a mixed review and said "There’s too much posturing and pouting, and not enough to stay tethered to the 10 long fifty-minute episodes."

Impact 
The music of the series became popular, with the titular track of Scam 1992, was recreated by a beatbox band from France, which went viral on YouTube with 970,000 views upon its release on 4 December 2020.

Future 
In March 2021, SonyLiv and Applause Entertainment announced the second installment of the franchise titled Scam 2003. It will be based on the stamp paper scam by Abdul Karim Telgi in 2003. It is to be directed by Hansal Mehta.

Awards and nominations

References

External links

 Watch Scam 1992 - Official Website

2020 Indian television series debuts
Television shows based on Indian novels
Television series based on actual events
Cultural depictions of fraudsters
SonyLIV original films